A cocktail is an alcoholic mixed drink. Most commonly, cocktails are either a single spirit or a combination of spirits, mixed with other ingredients such as juices, flavored syrups, tonic water, shrubs, and bitters. Cocktails vary widely across regions of the world, and many websites publish both original recipes and their own interpretations of older and more famous cocktails.

History 
The origins of the word "cocktail" have been debated (see section ). The first written mention of "cocktail" as a beverage appeared in The Farmers Cabinet, 1803 in the United States. The first definition of a cocktail as an alcoholic beverage appeared three years later in The Balance and Columbian Repository (Hudson, New York) May 13, 1806. Traditionally, cocktail ingredients included spirits, sugar, water and bitters, however, this definition evolved throughout the 1800s, to include the addition of a liqueur.

In 1862 Jerry Thomas published a bartender's: guide called How to Mix Drinks; or, The Bon Vivant's Companion which included 10 cocktail recipes using bitters to differentiate from other drinks such as punches and cobblers.

Cocktails continued to evolve and gain popularity throughout the 1900s, with the term eventually expanding to cover all mixed drinks.  In 1917 the term "cocktail party" was coined by Mrs. Julius S. Walsh Jr. of St. Louis, Missouri.  With wine and beer being less available during the Prohibition in the United States (1920–1933), liquor-based cocktails became more popular due to accessibility, followed by a decline in popularity during the late 1960s. The early to mid-2000s saw the rise of cocktail culture through the style of mixology which mixes traditional cocktails and other novel ingredients.

In the modern world and the Information Age, cocktail recipes are widely shared online on websites. Cocktails and restaurants that serve them are frequently covered and reviewed in tourism magazines and guides. Some cocktails, such as the Mojito, Manhattan, and Martini have become staples in both restaurants and pop culture phenomena.

Usage and related terms 

The term "cocktail" can refer to a wide variety of drinks; it is typically a mixed drink containing alcohol.

When a mixed drink contains only a distilled spirit and a mixer, such as soda or fruit juice, it is a highball. Many of the International Bartenders Association Official Cocktails are highballs. When a mixed drink contains only a distilled spirit and a liqueur, it is a duo, and when it adds cream or a cream-based liqueur, it is a trio. Additional ingredients may be sugar, honey, milk, cream, and various herbs.

Mixed drinks without alcohol that resemble cocktails can be known as "zero-proof" or "virgin" cocktails or "mocktails".

Etymology 
The origin of the word "cocktail" is disputed. The first recorded use of cocktail not referring to a horse is found in The Morning Post and Gazetteer in London, England, March 20, 1798:

The Oxford English Dictionary cites the word as originating in the U.S. The first recorded use of cocktail as a beverage (possibly non-alcoholic) in the United States appears in The Farmer's Cabinet, April 28, 1803:

The first definition of cocktail known to be an alcoholic beverage appeared in The Balance and Columbian Repository (Hudson, New York) May 13, 1806; editor Harry Croswell answered the question, "What is a cocktail?":

Dale DeGroff hypothesizes that the word evolved from the French , for an eggcup in which Antoine A. Peychaud, creator of Peychaud's Bitters, allegedly used to serve his guests a mix of cognac with a dash of his bitters.

Etymologist Anatoly Liberman endorses as "highly probable" the theory advanced by Låftman (1946), which Liberman summarizes as follows:

Cocktail historian David Wondrich also speculates that "cocktail" is a reference to gingering, a practice for perking up an old horse by means of a ginger suppository so that the animal would "cock its tail up and be frisky."

Several authors have theorized that "cocktail" may be a corruption of "cock ale".

Development 
There is a lack of clarity on the origins of cocktails. Traditionally cocktails were a mixture of spirits, sugar, water, and bitters. By the 1860s, however, a cocktail frequently included a liqueur.

The first publication of a bartenders' guide which included cocktail recipes was in 1862 – How to Mix Drinks; or, The Bon Vivant's Companion, by "Professor" Jerry Thomas. In addition to recipes for punches, sours, slings, cobblers, shrubs, toddies, flips, and a variety of other mixed drinks were 10 recipes for "cocktails". A key ingredient differentiating cocktails from other drinks in this compendium was the use of bitters. Mixed drinks popular today that conform to this original meaning of "cocktail" include the Old Fashioned whiskey cocktail, the Sazerac cocktail, and the Manhattan cocktail.

The ingredients listed (spirits, sugar, water, and bitters) match the ingredients of an Old Fashioned, which originated as a term used by late 19th-century bar patrons to distinguish cocktails made the  "old-fashioned" way from newer, more complex cocktails.

In the 1869 recipe book Cooling Cups and Dainty Drinks, by William Terrington, cocktails are described as:

The term highball appears during the 1890s to distinguish a drink composed only of a distilled spirit and a mixer.

Published in 1902 by Farrow and Jackson, "Recipes of American and Other Iced Drinks" contains recipes for nearly two dozen cocktails, some still recognizable today.
 
The first "cocktail party" ever thrown was allegedly by Julius S. Walsh Jr. of St. Louis, Missouri, in May 1917. Walsh invited 50 guests to her home at noon on a Sunday. The party lasted an hour until lunch was served at 1p.m. The site of this first cocktail party still stands. In 1924, the Roman Catholic Archdiocese of St. Louis bought the Walsh mansion at 4510 Lindell Boulevard, and it has served as the local archbishop's residence ever since.

During Prohibition in the United States (1920–1933), when alcoholic beverages were illegal, cocktails were still consumed illegally in establishments known as speakeasies. The quality of the liquor available during Prohibition was much worse than previously. There was a shift from whiskey to gin, which does not require aging and is, therefore, easier to produce illicitly. Honey, fruit juices, and other flavorings served to mask the foul taste of the inferior liquors. Sweet cocktails were easier to drink quickly, an important consideration when the establishment might be raided at any moment. With wine and beer less readily available, liquor-based cocktails took their place, even becoming the centerpiece of the new cocktail party.

Cocktails became less popular in the late 1960s and through the 1970s, until resurging in the 1980s with vodka often substituting for the original gin in drinks such as the martini. Traditional cocktails began to make a comeback in the 2000s, and by the mid-2000s there was a renaissance of cocktail culture in a style typically referred to as mixology that draws on traditional cocktails for inspiration but uses novel ingredients and often complex flavors.

See also 

 The Museum of the American Cocktail

Lists
 List of beverages
 List of cocktails
 List of IBA official cocktails
 List of national drinks

References

Further reading

Bibliography
 Burns, Walter. "The ultimate cocktail encyclopedia". San Diego, CA: Thunder Bay Press, 2014.
 Love Food Editors. "The art of mixology: Classic cocktails and curious concoctions". Bath: Parragon Books, 2015.
 Polinsky, Simon. "The complete encyclopedia of cocktails: Cocktails old and new, with and without alcohol". Netherlands: Rebo International, 2003.
 Regan, Mardee Haidin. "The bartender's best friend: A complete guide to cocktails, martinis, and mixed drinks". Hoboken, NJ: John Wiley & Sons, 2003.
 Thomas, Jerry. "How to mix drinks, or, The bon vivant's companion". London: Hesperus, 2012.

External links